The Amazônia-1 or SSR-1 (in Portuguese: Satélite de Sensoriamento Remoto-1), is the first Earth observation satellite developed by Brazil, helped by Argentina's INVAP, who provided the main computer, attitude controls and sensors, and the training of Brazilian engineers, and launched at 04:54:00 UTC (10:24:00 IST) on 28 February 2021.

Operations will be joint with the China–Brazil Earth Resources Satellite program (CBERS-4) satellite.

Background 

In the early 1990s, the design of SSR (Satélite de Sensoriamento Remoto) satellites, Amazônia-1 precursor, was revised and Instituto Nacional de Pesquisas Espaciais (INPE) technicians proposed replacing the polar orbit by an equatorial orbit, and this proposal was accepted. That made sense at that time as Brazil already had polar orbit coverage with the CBERS satellites. SSR-1 suffered several delays, either by lack of resources, or bid disputes. The effective start only occurred in 2001, when a contract was signed for the development of a multi-mission platform specifically, at the time, for this purpose.

In 2001, a joint study between the INPE and German Aerospace Center (DLR) was published, found that most of the SSR-1 requirements can be met by two sensors: the Camera VIS / NIR and other MIR. However, with the publication PNAE=(?) review in 2005, the SSR-1 ceased to be a priority.

Update 

Between September and October 2012, a structural model of the Amazônia-1 satellite was subjected to a series of vibration test.

In the latest review of the PNAE, published in January 2013, the Amazônia-1 resurfaced with the same name, and even successors were planned (Amazon-1B in 2017 and Amazon-2 in 2018). However, with polar orbit as a design feature, the release dates of these satellites can not be met. The Amazônia-1 schedule is already delayed by two years.

The satellite was originally supposed to launch on a Brazilian VLS-1 rocket, but the program was cancelled. 

The satellite was successfully launched on 28 February 2021 aboard ISRO's Polar Satellite Launch Vehicle (PSLV-C51) from the First Launch Pad of Satish Dhawan Space Centre. The cost of launch was nearly USD 26 million.

Post-launch
On March 2, 2021, journalist and science communicator Salvador Nogueira reported that according to trackers in the United States, the satellite may be tipping over in its orbit, but that the situation wasn't irreversible. This occurred after the satellite was put into "mission mode," which triggered a safety program where the satellite was in an attitude that ensured its solar panels were exposed to the Sun. The journalist later posted on Twitter that the situation may be due to the satellite's release and that it had already been resolved, but is awaiting word from INPE. Later Clezio di Nardin, INPE's director, confirmed that the satellite operates normally and is going through the qualification phase, which will last until March 15. The position of Clezio di Nardin and of Marcos Pontes, Minister of Science, was that nothing unusual had happened.

Features 

The current design features are as follows:
 Orbit: Sun-synchronous orbit
 Period of Earth imaging: 4 days
 Optical sighting wide imaging (camera with 3 bands in the visible (VIS) and 1 band in the near-infrared (NIR))
 Observation range:   with  resolution.
 Platform: Multi-Mission Platform (MMP)
 Weight:

Instruments 
 Advanced Wide Field Imager (AWFI), is a  resolution camera.

Amazônia-2 
The Amazônia-2 satellite was planned for launch in 2022 to replace its predecessor.

Gallery

See also 

 Brazilian space program

References 

Spacecraft launched in 2021
2021 in Brazil
Earth observation satellites of Brazil
Earth imaging satellites